Alexandros Papatzikos (Greek: Αλέξανδρος Παπατζίκος; born 20 December 1987) is a Greek professional footballer who plays as a center back for Super League 2 club Veria.

References

1987 births
Living people
Greek footballers
Super League Greece players
Veria NFC players
Association football defenders